Collapsed veins are a common injury that results from repeated use of intravenous injections. They are particularly common where injecting conditions are less than ideal, such as in the context of drug abuse.

Causes 
Permanent vein collapse occurs as a consequence of:
 Repeated injections, especially with blunt needles.
 Poor injection technique.
 Injection of substances which irritate the veins; in particular, injection of liquid methadone intended for oral use.
Smaller veins may collapse as a consequence of too much suction being used when pulling back against the plunger of the syringe to check that the needle is in the vein. This will pull the sides of the vein together and, especially if they are inflamed, they may stick together causing the vein to block. Removing the needle too quickly after injecting can have a similar effect.

Mechanism 
Veins may become temporarily blocked if the internal lining of the vein swells in response to repeated injury or irritation. This may be caused by the needle, the substance injected, or donating plasma.

Individual endothelial cells may change the structure of their cytoskeleton when a vein collapses to better deal with the increased shear stress.

Prognosis 
Once endothelial swelling subsides, circulation will often become re-established. Collapsed veins may never recover. Many smaller veins are created by the body to circulate the blood, but they are not adequate for injections or IVs.

See also 
 Phlebitis

References

Vascular diseases